Arturo Longton Guerro (25 June 1948 – 3 July 2015) was a Chilean lawyer and politician. He served as the first Governor of Marga Marga Province from 2010 to 2012.

Longton was born in Limache on 25 June 1948.  In 1983, he was elected mayor of Quilpué until 1987, when he assumed the mayorship of Valparaíso. He served in this capacity for one year. Representing the National Renewal, Longton was a deputy of the Chamber of Deputies of Chile for the 12th district between 1990 and 2006. In 2010, he was appointed by President Sebastián Piñera as the first governor of Marga Marga Province, a position he held until 16 November 2012.

On 3 July 2015, Longton was found dead in his apartment in Quilpué, Chile, at the age of 67. The suspected cause of death was cardiac arrest. He is survived by his wife Amelia Herrera, who is also a politician; sons Arturo and Andrés Longton; and daughter Amelia Longton.

References 

1948 births
2015 deaths
Pontifical Catholic University of Valparaíso alumni
Marga Marga
Marga Marga
Mayors of places in Chile
Mayors of Valparaíso
Members of the Chamber of Deputies of Chile
20th-century Chilean lawyers
21st-century Chilean lawyers
National Renewal (Chile) politicians